Moonlight Sinatra is a studio album by Frank Sinatra, released in March 1966. All of the tracks on the album are centered on the Moon, and were arranged and conducted by Nelson Riddle and his orchestra.

The title of the album is a reference to Ludwig van Beethoven's Moonlight Sonata.

Track listing
"Moonlight Becomes You" (Johnny Burke, Jimmy Van Heusen) – 2:46
"Moon Song" (Sam Coslow, Arthur Johnston) – 3:03
"Moonlight Serenade" (Glenn Miller, Mitchell Parish) – 3:26
"Reaching for the Moon" (Irving Berlin) – 3:05
"I Wished on the Moon" (Dorothy Parker, Ralph Rainger) – 2:53
"Oh, You Crazy Moon" (Burke, Van Heusen) – 3:12
"The Moon Got in My Eyes" (Burke, Johnston) – 2:52
"Moonlight Mood" (Harold Adamson, Peter de Rose) – 3:08
"Moon Love" (Mack David, André Kostelanetz) (adapted from Tchaikovsky's Fifth Symphony) – 4:14
"The Moon Was Yellow (And the Night Was Young)" (Fred E. Ahlert, Edgar Leslie) – 3:04

Personnel
Frank Sinatra – vocals
Nelson Riddle – arranger, conductor
The Nelson Riddle Orchestra

References

Frank Sinatra albums
Reprise Records albums
1966 albums
Albums produced by Sonny Burke
Albums arranged by Nelson Riddle
Albums conducted by Nelson Riddle
Works about the Moon